Delirium Tremens is the only studio album by the American experimental music ensemble Sulfur, released on June 16, 1998 by Goldenfly Records. With French composer and vocalist Michele Amar acting as bandleader, the album includes performances by members of Firewater, Motherhead Bug, Soul Coughing and Swans.

Reception
In writing for Ink 19, critic Kurt Channing criticized Delirium Tremens unclear tonal direction but claimed "Sulfur's distinguishing characteristics are its solid use of unusual instruments and Michele Amar’s vocal approach." A critic at babysue criticized the busy nature of some of the compositions but comparing the complex music somewhat favorably to early eighties progressive rock music.

Track listing

Personnel 
Adapted from the Delirium Tremens liner notes.

Sulfur
 Michele Amar – vocals, musical saw, sampler, programming, keyboards (2, 9), production
 Tony Corsano – drums, percussion
 Fiona Doherty – bass guitar
 Nick Heathen – piano, sampler, recording
 Dan Joeright – drums
 David Ouimet – trombone, melodica, vocals, illustrations
 Heather Paauwe – violin
 Norman Westberg – guitar
Additional musicians
 Amir – flute (15)
 Neil Benzra – percussion
 April Chung – violin
 Jim Colarusso – trumpet

Additional musicians (cont.)
 Yuval Gabay – drums
 Paula Henderson – baritone saxophone
 Shoyo Iida – guitar (3, 9, 16)
 Tokie Koyama – bass guitar
 Paul Nowindski – upright bass
 Jojo Mayer – glockenspiel
 Yuri Zak – accordion (2)
Production and additional personnel
 Martin Bisi – recording
 Matt Hathaway – recording
 Ingo Krauss – mixing (2, 4, 6, 9, 15)
 Bryan Martin – recording
 Roli Mosimann – mixing (3, 7, 8, 11, 12, 13, 16)
 Howie Weinberg – mastering

Release history

References

External links 
 Delirium Tremens at Discogs (list of releases)

1998 albums